Michael Garver Oxley (February 11, 1944 – January 1, 2016) was an American Republican politician and attorney who served as a U.S. Representative from the 4th congressional district of Ohio.

Early life and career 
Oxley was born in Findlay, Ohio, and received a Bachelor of Arts degree from Miami University in 1966 and a law degree from Ohio State University in 1969. He was a member of the Alpha chapter of the Sigma Chi fraternity at Miami.

From 1969 to 1972, Oxley worked for the Federal Bureau of Investigation and became active in the Ohio Republican Party. He served in the Ohio House of Representatives from 1973 to 1981.

Congress 

Oxley was elected a U.S. Representative in 1981 in a special election to fill the vacancy caused by the death of U.S. Representative Tennyson Guyer. Oxley began serving at this post in June 1981 in the 97th Congress.

He served as the chairman of the Committee on Financial Services, and was House sponsor of the Sarbanes–Oxley Act of 2002, which enacted "sweeping post-Enron regulations of publicly traded companies." He was also the House sponsor of a 2006 bill that condemned media outlets that had published information on a covert financial surveillance system.

Oxley announced his retirement from Congress on November 1, 2005, effective at the end of his term in 2007. He was succeeded by Republican Jim Jordan.

Post-congressional career
Following his retirement from Congress, Oxley was named a nonexecutive vice chairman for NASDAQ, and a partner at the law firm of BakerHostetler in Washington, D.C. He later became a lobbyist for the Financial Industry Regulatory Authority, the "self-regulatory body of the securities industry."

Oxley, a non-smoker, was diagnosed with lung cancer around 2006, and became a member of the Lung Cancer Alliance board. He died in McLean, Virginia, on January 1, 2016, from the disease.

Honors
The Findlay post office is named for Oxley and the portion of US 30 within Hancock County is designated "Congressman Michael G. Oxley Memorial Highway".

References

External links

 
 Interview on The BusinessMakers Show.

1944 births
2016 deaths
Federal Bureau of Investigation agents
Ohio lawyers
Republican Party members of the Ohio House of Representatives
Miami University alumni
People from Findlay, Ohio
Ohio State University Moritz College of Law alumni
American Lutherans
Deaths from cancer in Virginia
Deaths from lung cancer
20th-century American politicians
21st-century American politicians
20th-century American lawyers
20th-century Lutherans
Republican Party members of the United States House of Representatives from Ohio
People associated with BakerHostetler